Keith Palmer (June 23, 1957 – June 13, 1996) was an American country music artist. He was born Bryon Keith Palmer on June 23, 1957, in Hayti, Missouri, United States, and was raised in Corning, Arkansas. His name was actually supposed to be "Byron", but there was a mistake on the birth certificate.

He began his music career in 1975 as pianist for the Dixie Echoes, where he remained for three years. In 1991, Palmer released an album for Epic Records which produced two singles: "Don't Throw Me in the Briarpatch" and "Forgotten but Not Gone", both of which entered the U.S. Hot Country Singles & Tracks chart (now Hot Country Songs). He also co-wrote Reba McEntire's 1991 single "For My Broken Heart". Palmer died of cancer on June 13, 1996, in White House, Tennessee, at age 38.

Keith Palmer (1991)

Track listing
"Memory Lane" (Lonnie Wilson, Joe Diffie) – 3:15
"Forgotten but Not Gone" (Johnny MacRae, Buzz Cason) – 3:27
"If You Want to Find Love" (Skip Ewing, Max D. Barnes) – 2:31
"That's Enough to Keep Me Hangin' On" (Keith Palmer) – 3:51
"My Arms Tonight" (Jeff Tweel, Larry Shell) – 2:47
"Don't Throw Me in the Briarpatch" (Kix Brooks, Chris Waters) – 2:54
"She Left Me Yesterday" (Gary Harrison, Patrick Finch, Tim Mensy) – 3:31
"Livin' on What's Left of Your Love" (Sanger D. Shafer, Diffie) – 2:53
"When I Close My Eyes" (Nettie Musick, Mark Alan Springer) – 3:37
"I Picked a San Antonio Rose" (James Dean Hicks, Bobby P. Barker) – 2:55

Personnel
As listed in liner notes.
Jerry Douglas – Dobro
Paul Franklin – steel guitar
Rob Hajacos – fiddle
Bill Hullett – acoustic guitar
Brent Mason – electric guitar
Tim Mensy – acoustic guitar, background vocals, arrangement
Ron Oates – keyboards, arrangement
Keith Palmer – vocals
Matt Rollings – keyboards
Jim Vest – steel guitar
Lonnie Wilson – drums
Bob Wray – bass
Jonathan Yudkin – mandolin

Singles

References

1957 births
1996 deaths
American country singer-songwriters
American male singer-songwriters
Epic Records artists
Singer-songwriters from Missouri
20th-century American singers
People from Hayti, Missouri
Country musicians from Missouri
20th-century American male singers